Stenocarus is a genus of beetles belonging to the family Curculionidae. The species of this genus are found in Europe.

Species 
 Stenocarus canaliculatus Gyll, 1837 
 Stenocarus cardui (Herbst, 1784) 
Stenocarus ruficornis Stephens, 1831

References

Curculionidae
Curculionidae genera